The Basilicata regional election of 1990 took place on 6 and 7 May 1990.

Events
Christian Democracy was by far the largest party, gaining more than twice the share of vote of its main competitors, the Italian Communist Party, which had its worst result ever in a regional election, and the Italian Socialist Party, that gained its best result ever. After the election Christian Democrat Antonio Boccia was elected President of the Region.

Results

Source: Ministry of the Interior

Elections in Basilicata
1990 elections in Italy